The 1975 European Wrestling Championships  was held from 27 April  to 4 May 1975 in Ludwigshafen, West Germany.

Medal table

Medal summary

Men's freestyle

Men's Greco-Roman

References

External links
Fila's official championship website

Europe
W
European Wrestling Championships
Euro
1975 in European sport